Duke Eberhard Louis (18 September 1676 – 31 October 1733) was the Duke of Württemberg, from 1692 until 1733.

Biography

Eberhard Louis was born in Stuttgart the third child of Duke William Louis and his wife, Magdalena Sibylla of Hesse-Darmstadt. After the early and unexpected death of his father in 1677, the royal court decided to give guardianship to his uncle, Frederick Charles, Duke of Württemberg-Winnental.

In 1693, Magdalena Sibylla had the 16-year-old Eberhard Louis prematurely proclaimed Duke of Württemberg by Emperor Leopold I. The young duke showed no excessive interest in governmental affairs. Eberhard Louis was described by his contemporaries as superficial and easily influenced. Most importantly, his behavior led to the political fate of the land being greatly decided by his council. The duke preferred hunting and left the administration of his county in the hands his advisors. In 1697, he married Joanna Elisabeth of Baden-Durlach.

In 1707 he became the field marshal of the Swabian troops in the War of the Spanish Succession.

Shortly before 1700, he visited Louis XIV of France at the Palace of Versailles and planned to make Württemberg an absolutist state. He raised taxes, but financing still remained an obstacle. In 1704, he laid the foundation for his Ludwigsburg Palace. To save money, he allowed the workers to reside tax-free around the palace for 15 years. Later, the city of Ludwigsburg developed out of these residences.

As of 1711, Eberhard Louis spent ever more time in Ludwigsburg, usually in the company of his mistress, Wilhelmine von Grävenitz, whom he married in 1707. Because of pressure from the emperor, the marriage had to be quickly dissolved, and Grävenitz went into exile. Eberhard Louis followed her to Switzerland, where they stayed until 1710. The influential mistress was only allowed to return to the royal court once she had married another man, Graf von Würben. For over two decades, Grävenitz had a strong influence on the government of the land, and it was she who, together with Eberhard Ludwig, moved the royal residence and capital of the duchy from Stuttgart to the sparsely populated city of Ludwigsburg. Duchess Joanna Elisabeth of Baden-Durlach stayed in the royal palace in Stuttgart.

Because of the early death of his heir, Prince Frederick Louis, in 1731, the power threatened to shift into Catholic hands, which was unthinkable for Protestant Württemberg. Thus Duke Eberhard Louis dissolved his relations with Wilhelmine von Grävenitz and hoped to receive an heir from his legitimate and long ignored wife, Joanna Elisabeth. However, as he died in Ludwigsburg of a stroke on October 31, 1733, he left no heir behind. The duchy then fell into the hands of his converted nephew, Charles Alexander, Duke of Württemberg of the bloodline Württemberg-Winnental, though only for a few years.

Tolerance
For his time, Eberhard Louis was a very tolerant ruler, commonly noted by modern scholars as "enlightened." An example of this is the hiring of Oberkapellmeister Johann Christoph Pez, a Roman Catholic, whom Eberhard Louis guaranteed freedom from religious persecution.

Ancestors

Citations

References

 

1676 births
1733 deaths
17th-century dukes of Württemberg
18th-century dukes of Württemberg
Nobility from Stuttgart
Modern child monarchs
German army commanders in the War of the Spanish Succession
Hereditary Princes of Württemberg
Generals of the Holy Roman Empire
Soldiers of the Imperial Circles